Valide Dam is a historic dam located in Sarıyer district of Istanbul Province, Turkey.

Valide Dam was built in 1796 by Ottoman Sultan Selim III (reigned 1789–1807) to provide water for the donations in Eyüp of his mother Mihrişah Sultan (c. 1745–1805), who was titled Valide sultan during his reign. 

The dam is situated north of Bahçeköy, Sarıyer inside the Bentler Nature Park, which is part of the Belgrad Forest.

It is a solid gravity dam constructed in masonry with its crest and the waterside wall covered by marble. Two buttresses in  distance at toe are attached to the downstream wall to reinforce the structure.

References

Gravity dams
Dams in Istanbul Province
Dams completed in the 18th century
Buildings and structures of the Ottoman Empire
Sarıyer
Belgrad Forest